Yakup Sertkaya (born 23 September 1978) is a former Turkish professional footballer.

He started his career with Altay S.K. and then he also played for Bursaspor and Moldovan side FC Costuleni.

External links

References

1978 births
Living people
Turkish people of Bulgarian descent
Turkish footballers
Altay S.K. footballers
Bursaspor footballers
Bucaspor footballers
Balıkesirspor footballers
FC Costuleni players
Association football wingers
Süper Lig players
Turkish expatriate footballers
Expatriate footballers in Moldova
Turkish expatriate sportspeople in Moldova